The Lorillard Snuff Mill now known as the Lillian and Amy Goldman Stone Mill, is the oldest existing tobacco manufacturing building in the United States.  It was built around 1840 next to the Bronx River to supplement an earlier building of the same function.  The schist rock that makes up its walls was quarried locally.  It was declared a National Historic Landmark in 1977. It is located inside the New York Botanical Garden, itself an NHL.

History 

The Lorillard firm was founded by Pierre Abraham Lorillard in 1760.  His two sons, Peter and George, took over after he was killed during the American Revolutionary War, and they moved the manufacturing portion of the business to this location in the Bronx in 1792.  

Peter Lorillard III built a forty-five room mansion, stone cottage and stables nearby. The mansion burned in 1923. The Lorillard company and family left the property in the Bronx in 1870 after relocating their business to Jersey City, NJ.  The land was purchased by the New York City government in 1884 and was transferred to the New York Botanical Garden in 1915.

The Mill was retained by New York City Department of Parks and Recreation and used for storage and shops. In 1937 it was transferred to the Botanical Garden along with several other small parcels. The Mill was renovated in 1952-54. A cafe and patio were installed on the lower side facing the Bronx River, and a meeting room was fashioned from the space that once held snuff-grinding equipment.  The building had a $10.5 million restoration in 2010. It is now used for staff offices and a catering facility.

See also
List of New York City Designated Landmarks in The Bronx
National Register of Historic Places in Bronx County, New York

References

External links
New York Botanical Garden
Abigail Kirsch description including photos and floor plans

NYC application of historic preservation

Industrial buildings and structures on the National Register of Historic Places in New York City
Industrial buildings completed in 1840
National Historic Landmarks in New York City
Historic American Buildings Survey in New York City
Industrial buildings and structures in New York (state)
Buildings and structures in the Bronx
New York City Designated Landmarks in the Bronx
New York Botanical Garden
Lorillard Tobacco Company
Tobacco buildings in the United States
National Register of Historic Places in the Bronx
1840 establishments in New York (state)
Historic district contributing properties in New York City